Leicester Lions are a speedway team which originally operated from 1968 until 1983. The club returned to speedway for the 2011 Premier League season, moving up to the Elite League for the 2014 season. Before the 2019 season, the club dropped down to the SGB Championship before returning to the Premiership in 2023.

Previous teams
Speedway started at Leicester in 1928 at Leicester Stadium with the Leicester Stadium team entering the English Dirt Track League in 1929 finishing 5th but by 1931 the track, beset with problems, closed. Speedway was also staged at a track known as Leicester Super off Melton Road. After World War II, speedway returned in 1948. The team were nicknamed the Leicester Hunters and ran under that name until closure in 1962. In 1949 the team started in the National League Division Three and moved up over the years operating in the top flight for some time until the end of 1961.

The first Lions era (1968–1983)

Speedway returned to Leicester Stadium in 1968, with the formation of the Lions, when Reg Fearman and Ron Wilson moved in the Long Eaton team who had lost their home in 1967. The team competed in the British League, the top division of British speedway at the time. In 1977 Vic White took over from Wilson, the two acting as co-promoters until 1980 when Martin Rogers took over. Speedway continued until 1983 when the stadium was suddenly sold for housing development leaving the Lions homeless.  Notable riders from the first Lions era include Ray Wilson, Anders Michanek, Graham Plant, Alan Cowland, Malcolm Brown, John Boulger, Dave Jessup, Ila Teromaa, John Titman, Les Collins, Neil Collins, Rolf Gramstad, and Mark Courtney,

Season summary (first era)

Second Lions era (2011 onwards)

In the late 2000s, a group of fans with chairman Ken Naylor  from the Leicester Speedway Supporters Club/campaign group began discussions with various local bodies about the return of Speedway to the Leicester area.

At the meeting of the Leicester City Council Planning and Development Control Committee held on 4 August 2009 the application for a speedway track at Beaumont Park was approved. The new track was constructed at Beaumont Park with the Lions returning in March 2011 as a Premier League team, with three-time cycle speedway world champion David Hemsley as promoter.

2011 season
Riders signed for the start of the 2011 season were Sergey Darkin, Ilya Bondarenko, Jamie Courtney, Jan Graversen, John Oliver, Richard Hall (on loan from Sheffield Tigers), and Richard Sweetman (on loan from Swindon Robins). Mathieu Trésarrieu was brought in when Bondarenko was out through injury. By July 2011, four of the seven riders who started the season had either left or been replaced, with only Bondarenko, Graversen and Oliver remaining, and Hemsley had handed over team management duties to Jason Attwood. Promoter Hemsley brought in Kauko Nieminen, Henning Bager and Magnus Karlsson, with Charles Wright and Ashley Morris as reserves. In August, Oliver and Wright were released, with Viktor Bergström and Jason Garrity coming in for the remainder of the season.  Lions hosted the Premier League Four-Team Championship, finishing as runners-up to Ipswich Witches. The Lions finished the season in last place in the Premier League, despite good results at the end of the season. Graversen finished the season as the team's top points scorer with 211 points from league and cup matches.

2012 season
In November 2011, Graversen and Karlsson were the first riders confirmed for the 2012 season, with Jari Mäkinen the third signing. At the end of November Nieminen signed to return in 2012 and the top three in the 2012 team was completed by Danish Under-21 Champion Lasse Bjerre. Sixth rider to be signed was Simon Lambert. The team was completed by Simon Nielsen. An injury for Neilsen early in the season saw Kyle Hughes drafted in as a temporary replacement and a broken femur for Nielsen later in the season led to the signing of Linus Eklöf, with Lambert leaving to accommodate the Swede's higher average, and Lewis Blackbird moving up from the National League to complete the new line-up. Lions again finished as runners-up (this time to Berwick Bandits) in the Premier Fours. The team finished in sixth place in the Premier League, therefore making the end of season playoffs.

2013 season
The team for 2013 was announced, subject to BSPA approval, on 25 November 2012. Nieminen, Bjerre, Graversen, Nielsen, and Blackbird were joined by Kevin Doolan and Adam Roynon. An injury to Roynon after only one match for the Lions saw the return of Magnus Karlsson to the team. Despite scoring at over a point above his starting average, Blackbird was allowed to leave for Scunthorpe Scorpions in May after the signing of Robert Branford. Later that month, Nielsen lost his place to Alex Edberg. Branford was replaced by James Sarjeant in July and with two league matches to go Sarjeant and the injured Nieminen were replaced by Simon Nielsen and Linus Eklof. The team failed to reach the playoffs, finishing in seventh position in the league.

2014 season

At the BSPA AGM in November 2013 the Lions were accepted into the Elite League for 2014. The first two riders for 2014 were confirmed in early December when Tom Perry and Max Clegg were picked in the reserve draft. Mads Korneliussen, Patrick Hougaard, Peter Ljung, and Jason Doyle were named in the top five of the side, but doubts over Doyle's visa delayed the completion of the team. With Doyle receiving a tier 5 visa, his place was confirmed, and Simon Stead was named in the final team place. Norrie Allan was named as team manager, with former manager Glyn Taylor concentrating on track curation. In May Ljung withdrew from racing in Britain and was replaced by Lasse Bjerre. Perry was replaced by Josh Bates. An injury to Hougaard led him to withdraw from British speedway, and Lions brought in Krzysztof Buczkowski and Nicolai Klindt, with Bjerre losing his place. Lions finished bottom of the Elite League.  The Lions also entered a team in the National League-level National Trophy competition.

2015 season
The first rider signed for 2015 was Polish Under-21 champion Szymon Woźniak. They then selected Josh Auty and Simon Lambert in the reserve draft. Jason Doyle returned for a second season, and former Eastbourne Eagles rider Mikkel Michelsen also signed. Bjarne Pedersen and Grzegorz Walasek completed the team. Pedersen and Michelsen had both left by May, with Lewis Bridger and Sam Masters replacing them, although Bridger quit after only one meeting.

2016 season
With Lions' Saturday race night prompting 2015 number one Doyle to leave, Lions retained Walasek, Woźniak, and Auty from the previous season's team, also signing Paul Starke at reserve. Former rider Nikolai Klindt returned, but by late January they were still short of two heat leaders, with team manager Norrie Allan admitting "We need two riders of heat leader standard, and there just aren't any out there...we could be looking at putting in two riders just to complete a team." They eventually signed Sebastian Ułamek and Patrick Hougaard, starting the season over 4 points below the team building limit. After losing the first four league meetings, Walasek was dropped, to be replaced by Aaron Summers. An injury to Ułamek saw him being replaced by Davey Watt.

2017 season
Shortly before the start of the 2017 season, the team was taken over by Sheffield Tigers promoter Damian Bates, and the track altered to take in the curb around bends 1 and 2. The team joined the newly formed SGB Premiership. After finishing bottom of the league, the team avoided relegation with a playoff win over SGB Championship winners Sheffield Tigers.

2019 season
Before the 2019 season, the club owners took the decision to drop Leicester Lions down to the SGB Championship. Also for the 2019 season, for the first time the club owners decided to enter a team, Leicester Lion Cubs, into the third tier of British speedway, the National League.

On 15 August the Lions won their first national trophy when they defeated the Eastbourne Eagles 103-76 on aggregate to win the SGB Championship Shield. On 22 October they won the SGB Championship, beating Glasgow Tigers over two legs in the play-off final.

2021-2023 seasons
After two solid seasons, 3rd in the SGB Championship 2021 and reaching the play off final in the SGB Championship 2022, the club announced that they would move up to the Premiership for the 2023 season.

Season summary (second era)

Track records
2011–2012 (321m): 61.47s Kauko Nieminen, 7 April 2012
2013–2015 (317m): 59.06s Niels-Kristian Iversen, 7 June 2014
2016      (302m): 60.63s Craig Cook, 18 June 2016
2017–2019 (300m): 59.94s Josh Bates, 23 March 2019

See also
List of Leicester Lions riders
Speedway in Leicester

References

External links

Leicester Speedway Supporters Club
Leicester Lions Speedway Scrapbook
Leicester Mercury – News of Lions £2m revival plan

SGB Championship teams
Sport in Leicester
Sports clubs established in 1968
Sports clubs disestablished in 1983
Sports clubs established in 2011